Aliabad (also Romanized as ‘Alīābād; also known as ‘Alī Ābād) is a village in Churs Rural District, in the Central District of Chaypareh County, West Azerbaijan Province, Iran. At the 2006 census, its population was 56, in 11 families.

References 

Populated places in Chaypareh County